The 12847 / 48 Howrah–Digha AC Express is a train of the Shatabdi Express category belonging to Indian Railways – South Eastern Railway zone that runs between  and Digha Flag station in India.

It operates as train number 12847 from Howrah Junction to Digha Flag station and as train number 12848 in the reverse direction, serving the state of West Bengal.

Coaches

The 12847 / 48 Howrah–DighaAC Express presently has 1 Executive Class, 7 AC Chair Car & 2 End-on Generator cars.

It does not have a pantry car.

Also earlier Howrah–Digha Super AC Express was running with 10 coaches which were ICF Duronto liveried.

As is customary with most train services in India, coach composition may be amended at the discretion of Indian Railways depending on demand.

Service

The 12847 / 48 Howrah–Digha AC Express covers the distance of 186 kilometres in 03 hours 00 mins (62.00 km/hr) in both directions.

As the average speed of the train is above , as per Indian Railways rules, its fare includes a superfast surcharge.
The train was earlier running with ICF coach with maximum speed of 110 kmph as AC Express in early type.

Routeing & technical halts

The 12847 / 48 Howrah–Digha AC Express runs from Howrah directly to Digha Flag station. It has three halts.

Traction

As the route is fully electrified, it is hauled end to end by a Santragachi-based WAP-4 or WAP-7.

Timings

12847 Howrah–Digha AC Express leaves Howrah Junction on a daily basis at 11:10 hrs IST and reaches Digha Flag station at 14:20 hrs IST the same day.
12848 Digha–Howrah AC Express leaves Digha Flag station on a daily basis at 15:30 hrs IST and reaches Howrah Junction at 18:40 hrs IST the same day.

References

External links

Trains from Howrah Junction railway station
Rail transport in Howrah
Transport in Digha
AC Express (Indian Railways) trains
Rail transport in West Bengal
Railway services introduced in 2010